Lee Arenberg (born July 18, 1962) is an American actor. He is best known for his role as Pintel, one of Captain Barbossa's crew, in the Pirates of the Caribbean film series. He also had a recurring role as the dwarf Grumpy in the television series Once Upon a Time.
He attended UCLA as a theatre major.

Career
Arenberg attended Santa Monica High School with future "brat pack" actors Sean Penn, Robert Downey Jr. and Emilio Estevez, and co-wrote a play with Estevez which was directed by Penn. Lee's first professional job was in 1986 at the Mark Taper Forum in "Ghetto", a play directed by Gordon Davidson. Within weeks he was cast in three films, including the role of Norton in the feature Tapeheads (1988) opposite the film's co-stars Tim Robbins and John Cusack. Guest appearances on television began in 1987 with the hit sitcom Perfect Strangers (1986), and have continued with memorable roles such as the parking space-stealing New Yorker Mike Moffitt on Seinfeld (1992) and as the murderous rock promoter opposite Katey Sagal and Sam Kinison in Tales from the Crypt (1989), as well as roles on Arli$$ (1996), and Friends (1994). Arenberg can also be seen in the role of the well endowed studio head Bobby G. on the controversial short-lived Fox sitcom Action (1999) opposite series star Jay Mohr.

Arenberg has also guest starred on Star Trek: The Next Generation, Star Trek: Deep Space Nine, Star Trek: Voyager, and Star Trek: Enterprise. Coincidentally, in two of his appearances, ("The Nagus" and "United"), he played a character named Gral, one a Ferengi and the other a Tellarite. In 1992, Lee appeared on the TV series Night Court. Arenberg also played the recurring role of bookie Mike Moffitt in two episodes of Seinfeld. In "The Parking Space", he and George Costanza had a parking dispute, while in "The Susie" his thumbs were accidentally broken while trying to repair Jerry Seinfeld's car trunk.

He also guest starred in the fifth season of Friends in an episode titled "The One with the Inappropriate Sister". He guest starred on an episode of Brotherly Love entitled "Motherly Love". He had a bit part as a bumbling Hold-up Man in RoboCop 3. Lee also played Dr. Moyer in the Scrubs episode "My Own American Girl". He also starred as the dwarf Elwood Gutworthy in Dungeons & Dragons (2000), and the pirate Pintel in the Pirates of the Caribbean trilogy. He guest starred as "Hair Plugs" in Grounded for Life (2001).

A graduate of Santa Monica High in 1980, he starred as the regular character "Grumpy/Leroy" on the hit ABC television series Once Upon a Time. As he confirmed when speaking at the Farpoint Star Trek Convention in Timonium, Maryland, Arenberg's character Pintel did not return in the fourth Pirates film.

Arenberg's face as skeletal Pintel from Pirates of the Caribbean: Curse of the Black Pearl, can be seen popping up in the treasure caves on Pirate's Lair on Tom Sawyer Island in Disneyland.

Filmography

Film

Television

References

External links

American male film actors
American male television actors
Male actors from Palo Alto, California
1962 births
Living people
20th-century American male actors
21st-century American male actors
Jewish American male actors
21st-century American Jews